, was a princess and an Empress consort of Japan. She was the consort of her cousin Emperor Reizei of Japan. She was the daughter of Emperor Suzaku and Princess Hiroko.

Life
She was born in 950 after the abdication of her father.  She was made princess on the 8th lunar month, 10th the same year. Her mother Princess Hiroko died soon after her birth. Her father the former Emperor Suzaku died at the age of 30 in 952. Then she was raised by her paternal uncle Emperor Murakami due to the early death of her parents. 

She was made Empress consort after her cousin Prince Norihira acceded to the throne as Emperor Reizei in 967. She had no children. 

After the abdication of Emperor Reizei, she was made Empress Dowager in the 7th lunar month, 973 and Grand Empress Dowager in the 7th lunar month, 986. She died from disease at the age of 50 on the 12th lunar month 1st, 999.

Notes

Japanese princesses
Japanese empresses
Japanese Buddhists
10th-century Buddhist nuns
950 births
1000 deaths
People from Kyoto
Daughters of emperors